Ray Colcord III (December 24, 1949 – February 5, 2016) was an American film and television composer known for TV series such as 227, Silver Spoons, My Two Dads, Dinosaurs, Big Brother, and Boy Meets World. He is a former governor of the Academy of Television Arts & Sciences, a past President of the Society of Composers & Lyricists, served on the board of directors of the Film Preservation Society and was a member of the National Film Preservation Board. He has received ASCAP, BMI, and Dramalogue awards.

Life and career 
Prior to his film and television career, Colcord worked as a session musician and an A&R (Artists & Repertoire) representative for Columbia Records, was responsible for Aerosmith's signing, and co-produced their second album, Get Your Wings. He was the first music director of the Los Angeles improvisational comedy group The Groundlings.

Colcord played keyboards on the Lou Reed live album Rock n Roll Animal (1974). Ray also played keyboards on American Pie, the album by Don McLean.

Death
Colcord died on February 5, 2016, in Los Angeles at the age of 66. He had pancreatic cancer for four years. He was survived by his wife Madeleine, to whom he was married since 1983, and son Alex.

Film
Killer By Nature
Resurrection Mary
Journeys Below the Line: ER - The Prop Masters (video documentary ) 
Journeys Below the Line: 24 - The Editing Process (video documentary) 
The King's Guard 
Heartwood
The Paper Brigade (video)
Amityville Dollhouse: Evil Never Dies (video)
Wish Upon a Star
The Sleeping Car 
The Devonsville Terror - Composer

Songs
Dumb & Dumber - "Hip Hop Solution", "Rap me Silly", "Endangered Species", "Snow Bird Serenade"
Lara Croft Tomb Raider: The Cradle of Life  - "Bouzouki Trella"
Earth Girls Are Easy -  "I Like 'Em Big And Stupid"
Dr. Demento 20th Anniversary Collection (video documentary) - "The Homecoming Queen's Got a Gun")

Television
Lost at Home (TV series) 
Family Affair (TV series) 
Big Brother (TV series)
Embassy Television/Pay Television/Communications/Telecommunications Theme (1982)
Style and Substance (TV series)
Tales from the Tomb: Lost Sons of the Pharaohs (TV documentary)
You Wish (TV series)
Hiller and Diller (TV series)  
Promised Land (TV series) 
Devil's Food (TV movie) 
Television's Comedy Classics (TV movie)
Real Funny (TV movie) 
Wow! The Most Awesome Acts on Earth (TV movie)
Maybe This Time (TV series)
50 Years of Soaps: An All-Star Celebration (TV movie) 
Black Sheep (TV movie)
Boy Meets World (TV series)
Girl Meets World
The Charmings (TV series, theme and music for season two)
Almost Home (TV series) 
Where I Live (TV series) 
Scorch (TV series)
The Torkelsons (TV series)
Dinosaurs (TV series)
The Julie Show (TV movie)
The Simpsons (TV series) 
Dead Putting Society 
Singer & Sons (TV series)
Jury Duty: The Comedy (TV movie) 
Ann Jillian (TV series) 
Live-In (TV series)
Trial and Error (TV series) 
Women in Prison (TV series) 
My Two Dads (TV series) 
The Charmings (TV series) 
Sweet Surrender (TV series)
227 (TV series) 
Double Trouble (TV series)
Silver Spoons (TV series) - Composer for second half of seasons 4 to 5
Off Your Rocker (TV movie) 
The Facts of Life (TV series) - Composer for seasons 7 to 9

References

External links

1949 births
2016 deaths
People from New York City
Deaths from pancreatic cancer
Musicians from Los Angeles
Musicians from New York City
Deaths from cancer in California
American film score composers
American television composers
American session musicians
American pianists
American rock keyboardists
Columbia Records
American male pianists
American male film score composers